Guangzhou Daily or Guangzhou Ribao, also known as Canton Daily, is the official newspaper of the Guangzhou Municipal Committee of the Chinese Communist Party (中共广州市委). Established on December 1, 1952, the newspaper is owned by the Guangzhou Daily Newspaper Group (广州日报报业集团), which also runs other newspapers and magazines such as China Business News (第一财经日报) and South Reviews (南风窗).

Guangzhou Daily, published the Guangzhou Daily Agency, has been closed three times and resumed three times, the last resumption was on February 26, 1972, when it was resumed as Guangzhou Post (广州报).

References

External links
  

1952 establishments in China
Chinese-language newspapers (Simplified Chinese)
Chinese Communist Party newspapers
Mass media in Guangzhou
Daily newspapers published in China
Newspapers established in 1952